Paul (Louis-Toussaint) Héroult (10 April  1863 – 9 May 1914) was a French scientist. He was the inventor of the aluminium electrolysis and developed the first successful commercial electric arc furnace. He lived in Thury-Harcourt, Normandy.

Life and career 
Paul Héroult read Henri Sainte-Claire Deville's treatise on aluminium, when he was 15 years old. At that time, aluminium was as expensive as silver and was used mostly for luxury items and jewellery. Héroult wanted to make it cheaper.
He succeeded in doing so when he discovered the electrolytic aluminium process in 1886.
The same year, in the United States, Charles Martin Hall (1863–1914) was discovering the same process. Because of this, the process was called the Hall–Heroult process.

Héroult's second most important contribution is the first commercially successful electric arc furnace (EAF) for steel in 1900. The Héroult furnace gradually replaced the giant smelters for the production of a variety of steels. In 1905, Paul Héroult was invited to the United States as a technical adviser to several companies, and in particular to the United States Steel Corporation and the Halcomb Steel Company. Halcomb installed the first Héroult furnace in the US.

The invention of the electric arc furnace probably began when Humphry Davy discovered the carbon arc in 1800. Then in 1878 Carl Wilhelm Siemens patented, constructed and operated both direct and indirect EAFs. Commercial use still needed to wait for larger supplies of electricity and better carbon electrodes.

Paul Héroult is renowned for other major inventions, among them a
self-supporting conduit still used to bring water down from mountain heights and across rivers to hydraulic power plants, avoiding the need to build expensive bridges.

Christian Bickert said of him 

Héroult's death on 9 May 1914 followed his reaching the age of 51 by twenty-nine days.

Footnotes and references

See also
 Crucible Industries, Halcomb merged into Crucible in 1900
 Methods of steel production:
  Metallurgy cementation process 
  Crucible steel processes
  Open-hearth furnace process, the Siemens-Martin process
 Steel industry
 Crucible steel
 Blast furnace
 Steel mill or Steelworks
 History of aluminium

External links

Images and history at pagesperso-orange.fr
Michel Caron, Paul Héroult (1863-1914): un grand inventeur original, La Vie des Sciences, Comptes Rendus, t.5, no. 1, pp.39-57

1863 births
1914 deaths
People from Thury-Harcourt
19th-century French inventors